Nanlang is a  town situated at the eastern periphery of the city of Zhongshan in Guangdong Province, China. Nanlang has administrative jurisdiction over the village of Cuiheng, the birthplace of Sun Yat-sen.

Administration
Nanlang is directly administered by the prefectural city of Zhongshan.

Transportation
The town has a station on the Guangzhou–Zhuhai Intercity Mass Rapid Transit.

See also
Nanlang dialect

External links

Nanlang Township Government Website

Zhongshan
Towns in Guangdong